The Teachers' International Trade Secretariat or International Trade Secretariat of Teachers (ITST) was a global union federation bringing together unions representing schoolteachers.

History
The International Federation of Civil Servants and Teachers was formed in 1925, but in many countries, teachers were not part of the same unions as civil servants, and preferred to organise separately.  As a result, in November 1926, the International Federation of Trade Unions sponsored the creation of a new "Teachers' International Trade Secretariat", which brought together the teachers' unions from the old federation, along with some other trade unions. Like its predecessor, it affiliated to the International Federation of Trade Unions.  It established headquarters in Brussels.

In 1945, the federation affiliated to the new International Professional Department of Education (DPIE), and the following year, it merged into the new World Federation of Teachers' Unions.  Some members unions refused to join, and instead helped found the new Joint Committee of International Teachers' Federations.

Affiliates
As of 1935, the federation had a total membership of 108,750, in the following affiliates:

Leadership

Secretaries
1927: Louis Klein
1936: Joseph Bracops

Presidents
Lebaillif
1936: Ludovic Zoretti

References

Global union federations
Trade unions established in 1926
Trade unions disestablished in 1946
Education trade unions